Twigg is a surname. Notable people with the surname include:

Derek Twigg (born 1959), British politician
Gary Twigg (born 1984), Scottish footballer
Georgie Twigg (born 1990), English field hockey player
Rebecca Twigg (born 1963), American cyclist
Stephen Twigg (born 1966), British politician
Thurston Twigg-Smith (1921–2016), American businessman and philanthropist
William Twigg-Smith (1883–1950), New Zealand artist

See also
Twiggs (disambiguation)
Twig